King of California is an album by the American musician Dave Alvin, released in 1994.

Reception

AllMusic critic Mark Deming wrote: "While King of California was often lumped in with the then-fashionable unplugged craze, in retrospect it was the album where Dave Alvin's abilities as a performer began to catch up with his gifts as a songwriter, pointing the way for his later albums Blackjack David and Public Domain."

Track listing
All songs by Dave Alvin unless otherwise noted.
"King of California" – 4:51
"Barn Burning" – 4:01
"Fourth of July" – 4:35
"Goodbye Again" (Dave Alvin, Rosie Flores) – 3:58
"East Texas Blues" (Alexander Herman Moore) – 4:07
"Every Night About This Time" – 4:24
"Bus Station" – 4:04
"Mother Earth" (Memphis Slim) – 3:39
"Blue Wing" (Tom Russell) – 3:43
"Little Honey" (Alvin, John Doe) – 5:10	
"(I Won't Be) Leaving" – 5:06
"What Am I Worth" (Darrell Edwards, George Jones) – 3:20
"Border Radio" – 3:51

Personnel
Dave Alvin – vocals, guitar
Chris Gaffney – background vocals
Bob Glaub – bass
Patrick Warren – keyboards
Don Heffington – drums, percussion
James Cruce – drums, percussion, washboard
Bob Clar – bass, percussion
Greg Leisz – guitar, slide guitar, pedal steel guitar, lap slide guitar, Weissenborn, mandolin
Alan Deremo – bass
Skip Edwards – accordion, organ
Don Falzone – bass
Rosie Flores – vocals on "Goodbye Again"
Bobby Lloyd Hicks – drums, percussion, background vocals
James Intveld – bass
David Jackson – accordion
Donald Lindley – drums, percussion, background vocals
Syd Straw – vocals on "What Am I Worth"
Steve Van Gelder – fiddle
Jimmie Wood -	Harmonica

Production notes
Paul DuGre – engineer, mixing
Joe Peccerillo – assistant engineer
Gavin Lurssen – mastering
Shelly Heber – design
Beth Herzhaft – photography

References

1994 albums
Dave Alvin albums
HighTone Records albums